Litespeed may refer to:

 Litespeed, a bicycle manufacturer
 Litespeed F3, a formula three racing team
 Moyes Litespeed, an Australian hang glider design
 LiteSpeed Web Server

See also
 Lightspeed (disambiguation)